Sturt Lions Soccer Club is an Australian professional football club in Adelaide, South Australia. Nicknamed the Lions, Sturt are associated with FFSA, and they currently play in the NPL South Australia. The league is a first tier-league in South Australia and second-tier nationally. The club, while based in the suburbs in and around the city of Mitcham, they currently play their senior home games at Adelaide Shores Football Centre in West Beach. The club has one of the largest junior programs in South Australia.

In 2017 the Lions were Champions of State League 1 after defeating White City, Adelaide Raiders, South Adelaide and Western Strikers in the Final Series. As the Champions, the Lions were promoted to the NPL in 2018.They were again promoted to the NPL in 2021 after winning the state league final through spectacular goals from Gonzalo Rodriguez. Sturt has gone from strength to strength under long term manager Lino Fusco. They are hot favourites to challenge for the NPL Title in 2023.

In 2020 the Lions were again Champions of State League 1 after defeating South Adelaide over 2 legs before beating White City in the Promotion Final. As the Champions, the Lions were promoted to the NPL in 2021.

Notable players
In May 2018 Sturt signed Italian striker Matteo Federici. Federici came through the ranks for Serie A sides Lecce and Chievo Verona. Federici scored 6 goals in his first 7 appearances for Sturt and his performances have been acclaimed in the local media.

In August 2021 Sturt signed Adelaide United legend Michael Marrone. After amassing 250+ games in the A-League and making 1 appearance for the National Team, Michael returned to the local league with Sturt. After signing on the 3rd of August, Michael scored 7 minutes into his debut on the following weekend.

Honours
 SL1 South Australia Champions: 2017, 2020

Divisional history

References

External links
Official club website
Sturt Lions Facebook

Soccer clubs in Adelaide
Soccer clubs in South Australia
Association football clubs established in 2003
2003 establishments in Australia